The Friendship sloop, also known as a Muscongus Bay sloop or lobster sloop, is a gaff-rigged working boat design that originated in Friendship, Maine around 1880 and has survived as a traditional-style sailboat.

History 
Fishermen in Friendship and neighboring Bremen collectively originated the boat's design, influenced in part, by the fishing sailboats of Gloucester, Massachusetts. The boat was used primarily for lobstering or local commerce.  Boat builder Wilbur A. Morse was principle among five major Muscongus Bay builders that produced the design from the 1880s to the 1910s. From then until 1960 four major builders continued the tradition, three from the region.  

One person could manage its single-masted rig and haul traps unassisted, yet the boat could carry sizable loads. With an open cockpit aft, and  a small forward cabin outfitted with bunks and a stove, it made fishing during cold weather much less arduous than in an open boat. By 1900 these sloops ranged from  feet long along the deck and were used for bringing fish or lobsters from offshore vessels to processing plants.

In the 1900s the boats received auxiliary motors until 1920, when power boats supplanted them for commercial use. Thereafter, the fleet became available to those who adapted  boats to become affordable sailing yachts.

Modern reproductions, both wooden and fiberglass, continue to be built. And the boat design and historical examples are preserved through the Friendship Sloop Society. The society holds annual races in Maine.

Design and classification 
Friendship sloops typically have a clipper bow, a full keel, an elliptical stern and a bowsprit. The mast height is approximately equal to the length of the deck and stepped forward, such that the head sails are attached to the bowsprit. The hull typically has a full length keel, traditionally ballasted with rocks or more recently with steel. They are gaff-rigged, with a mainsail, a staysail and normally a jib.  They may additionally have a topmast with a main topsail and jib topsail (flying jib). They have ranged from  feet along the deck; plans are available for such vessels up to  along the deck.

The Friendship Sloop Society initially classified the boats, as follows:

 Class A – Original vessels
 Class B – Replicas
 Class C – Near replicas
 Class D – Near replicas other than wood

In 1986, it combined classes B through D. The boats recognized as "one of a kind" outnumber those regarded as "semi-production". Races are held in two divisions for boats  or shorter on the deck (Division I) and those longer than that (Division II).

References

External links
Friendship Sloop Society

Types of fishing vessels
Keelboats